Shan Huanhuan (born 24 January 1999) is a Chinese professional footballer who currently plays for Chinese Super League club Dalian Professional.

Club career
Shan Huanhuan started his professional football career in 2016 when he was promoted to Chinese Super League side Beijing Guoan's first team squad by Alberto Zaccheroni. On 9 April 2016, Shan made his debut in a 3–0 home defeat against Guangzhou Evergrande, coming on for Zhao Hejing in the 46th minute, which made him the first player to be born in and beyond 1999 to make an appearance in the Chinese Super League. He refused to extend his contract and left Beijing Guoan at the end of 2016 season.

Shan joined Portuguese side Vitória Guimarães's U19 team in September 2017. He was promoted to the B team of LigaPro in the summer of 2018. On 12 August 2018, he made his debut for the club in a 1–0 home defeat against Cova da Piedade.

On 30 July 2019, Shan returned to China and signed with top tier club Dalian Professional. The following season he would be promoted to the senior team, however it wasn't until the 2021 Chinese Super League when he made his debut in a league game on 22 April 2021 against Changchun Yatai F.C. in a 2-1 defeat. He would go on to score his first goal for the club in a league game on 3 January 2022 against Qingdao F.C. in a game that ended in a 4-1 victory.

Career statistics

References

External links

1999 births
Living people
People from Pingdingshan
Chinese footballers
Footballers from Henan
Chinese Super League players
Liga Portugal 2 players
Beijing Guoan F.C. players
Vitória S.C. B players
Dalian Professional F.C. players
Association football forwards
Chinese expatriate footballers
Expatriate footballers in Portugal
Chinese expatriate sportspeople in Portugal